Ceylalictus variegatus is a species of bee in the family Halictidae. The species was erected in 1789 by Guillaume-Antoine Olivier.

References

Insects described in 1789
Halictidae